The fatigue limit or endurance limit is the stress level below which an infinite number of loading cycles can be applied to a material without causing fatigue failure. Some metals such as ferrous alloys and titanium alloys have a distinct limit, whereas others such as aluminium and copper do not and will eventually fail even from small stress amplitudes. Where materials do not have a distinct limit the term fatigue strength or endurance strength is used and is defined as the maximum value of completely reversed bending stress that a material can withstand for a specified number of cycles without a fatigue failure.

Definitions
The ASTM defines fatigue strength, as "the value of stress at which failure occurs after  cycles", and fatigue limit, as "the limiting value of stress at which failure occurs as  becomes very large". ASTM does not define endurance limit, the stress value below which the material will withstand many load cycles, but implies that it is similar to fatigue limit.

Some authors use endurance limit, for the stress below which failure never occurs, even for an indefinitely large number of loading cycles, as in the case of steel; and fatigue limit or fatigue strength, for the stress at which failure occurs after a specified number of loading cycles, such as 500 million, as in the case of aluminium. Other authors do not differentiate between the expressions even if they do differentiate between the two types of materials.

Typical values
For iron, aluminium, and copper alloys,  is typically 0.4 times the ultimate tensile strength. Note that these values are for smooth "un-notched" test specimens. The endurance limit for notched specimens (and thus for many practical design situations) is significantly lower.

For polymeric materials, the fatigue limit has been shown to reflect the intrinsic strength of the covalent bonds in polymer chains that must be ruptured in order to extend a crack.  So long as other thermo chemical processes do not break the polymer chain (i.e. ageing or ozone attack), a polymer may operate indefinitely without crack growth when loads are kept below the intrinsic strength.

The concept of fatigue limit, and thus standards based on a fatigue limit such as ISO 281:2007 rolling bearing lifetime prediction, remains controversial, at least in the US.

History
The concept of endurance limit was introduced in 1870 by August Wöhler. However, recent research suggests that endurance limits do not exist for metallic materials, that if enough stress cycles are performed, even the smallest stress will eventually produce fatigue failure.

See also
Fatigue (material)

References

Elasticity (physics)
Fracture mechanics
Materials degradation